The 1983 Brisbane Rugby League premiership was the 75th season of Brisbane's semi-professional rugby league football competition. Eight teams from across Brisbane competed for the premiership, which culminated in a grand final match between the Eastern Suburbs and Redcliffe clubs.

Season summary 
Teams played each other three times, with 21 rounds of competition played. It resulted in a top four of Eastern Suburbs, Redcliffe, Fortitude Valley, Southern Suburbs.

Teams

Finals

Grand Final 

Eastern Suburbs 14 (Tries: B. Tengdahl, B. Backer. Goals: S. McNally 3.)

Redcliffe 6 (Tries: S. Cherry. Goals: J. Chapman.)

Winfield State League 

The 1983 Winfield State League was the second season of the Queensland Rugby League's statewide competition. A total of 14 teams competed in the inaugural season, 8 of which were BRL Premiership clubs. The remaining six were regional teams from across the state, hence the State League name. Fortitude Valley won the title with a 21-12 win over Easts Tigers in the final at Lang Park in Brisbane.

References

Rugby league in Brisbane
Brisbane Rugby League season